This Is No Time ta Sleep is the first studio album by New York crust punk band Morning Glory. It was released in 2001 on Revolution Rock Records.

Track list

References

2001 albums
Morning Glory (band) albums